Michael Bresagk (born February 24, 1970) is a German former ice hockey defenceman.

Career
Bresagk began his career with PEV Weißwasser and then moved to EV Landshut where he spent five season before moving to France to play in the Ligue Magnus for Brest Albatros Hockey, guiding them to the Magnus Cup in his one season in 1997.

He then moved back to Germany to play for the Frankfurt Lions. He helped the Lions capture the DEL Championship in 2004, their first in history. The achievement marked a complete turnaround for the Lions who in the previous season were supposedly relegated to the 2nd Bundesliga but were allowed back into the DEL due to the financial collapse of the Schwenninger Wild Wings.

However, in recent years the Lions themselves would suffer from mounting financial difficulties and subsequently folded after the 2009-10 season despite finished second in the league. Bresagk would retire as a player afterwards.

External links

1970 births
Living people
Brest Albatros Hockey players
Frankfurt Lions players
German ice hockey defencemen
EV Landshut players
Löwen Frankfurt players
People from Bezirk Cottbus
Sportspeople from Cottbus